Michael Mahoney may refer to:

Michael Sean Mahoney (1939–2008), historian of science
Michael P. Mahoney (1842–1925), attempted to assassinate Mayor John Purroy Mitchel of New York City
Mike Mahoney (catcher) (born 1972), Major League Baseball catcher
Mike Mahoney (first baseman) (1873–1940), first baseman in Major League Baseball
Mike Mahoney (footballer) (born 1950), English football goalkeeper
Mike Mahoney (American football) (born 1951), American college football player and coach
Jerry Mahoney (umpire) (Michael Jeremiah Mahoney, 1860–1947), Major League Baseball umpire
Michael Mahoney-Johnson (born 1976), English footballer
Michael Mahoney, 19th-century American thief known by the alias Wreck Donovan
Michael Mahoney, a character in the film A Night Like This